Aithorape roseicornis, Dognin's satin, is a moth of the Megalopygidae family. It was described by Paul Dognin in 1899. It is found in Colombia, Ecuador and Peru, where it inhabits rainforests and cloudforests at altitudes between 200 and 1,200 meters.

References

Moths described in 1899
Megalopygidae